Eternal Moment is a 2011 Chinese romantic drama film directed by Zhang Yibai and starring Xu Jinglei, Li Yapeng and Chapman To.

The film is a sequel to the television drama, Cherish Our Love Forever (1998), which was also directed by Zhang. The film follows the two leads from that earlier drama (played by Xu Jinglei and Li Yapeng) reuniting after being apart for 12 years.

Music 
Faye Wong and Eason Chan recorded the theme song "Because of Love" (因為愛情) for the film.

Reception
Film Business Asia's Derek Elley gave the film a rating of 6 out of 10.

References

External links
 

2010s Mandarin-language films
Films directed by Zhang Yibai
Chinese romantic drama films
2011 romantic drama films
2011 films